Malé Lednice is a village and municipality in Považská Bystrica District in the Trenčín Region of north-western Slovakia.

History
In historical records the village was first mentioned in 1339.

Geography
The municipality lies at an altitude of 425 metres and covers an area of 15.105 km². It has a population of about 528 people.

External links
 
https://web.archive.org/web/20070513023228/http://www.statistics.sk/mosmis/eng/run.html

Villages and municipalities in Považská Bystrica District